Al-Madinah, also known as the City Center, is a district of Al-Hasakah, Syria in Syrian Arab Republic.

References

Districts of Al-Hasakah